The 1970 Eastern Illinois Panthers football team represented Eastern Illinois University as an independent during the 1970 NCAA College Division football season. The Panthers played their home games at O'Brien Stadium in Charleston, Illinois. Led by sixth-year head coach Clyde Biggers, they compiled a 2–8 record.

Schedule

References

Eastern Illinois
Eastern Illinois Panthers football seasons
Eastern Illinois Panthers football